The Agrafiotis is a river in Evrytania, Greece.  The river takes its name from Agrafa, the mountainous region where it flows. The river begins near the village Trovato in the north of Evrytania. It flows south through a valley with forests and small farmlands. It is crossed by a few stone bridges. Near the village Tripotamo, the river empties into Kremasta Reservoir, built in 1969, which is drained by the river Acheloos. The Kremasta Reservoir is the largest in Greece.

External links
Agrafiotis on GTP Travel Pages (in English and Greek)

Landforms of Evrytania
Rivers of Greece
Rivers of Central Greece
Agrafa